No Room for Squares is an album by jazz tenor saxophonist Hank Mobley recorded on March 7 & October 2, 1963 and released on the Blue Note label. It features performances by Mobley, trumpeters Lee Morgan and Donald Byrd, pianists Andrew Hill and Herbie Hancock, bassists John Ore and Butch Warren, and drummer Philly Joe Jones. Material recorded at the March 7 session was also included on The Turnaround! with the entire session collected for the first time on the 1989 CD edition of Straight No Filter. The 1989 CD issue of No Room for Squares collects the entire October 7 session save an alternate take of "Carolyn" that was first issued in 2019 as part of The Complete Hank Mobley Blue Note Sessions 1963-70.

Reception
The AllMusic review by Thom Jurek awarded the album 4 stars, stating: "All eight cuts here move with similar fluidity and offer a very gritty and realist approach to the roots of hard bop. Highly recommended."

Track listing 
All compositions by Hank Mobley except where noted

Personnel 
 Hank Mobley – tenor saxophone
 Lee Morgan – trumpet (tracks 1, 2, 4, 5, 7, 8)
 Donald Byrd – trumpet (3, 6)
 Andrew Hill – piano (1, 2, 4, 5, 7, 8)
 Herbie Hancock – piano (3, 6)
 John Ore – bass (1, 2, 4, 5, 7, 8)
 Butch Warren – bass (3, 6)
 Philly Joe Jones – drums

References 

1964 albums
Albums produced by Alfred Lion
Blue Note Records albums
Hank Mobley albums
Albums recorded at Van Gelder Studio